Fond-des-Blancs Airport  is an airstrip  northeast of Fond-des-Blancs, a communal section in the Sud Department of Haiti. It is surrounded by rising terrain in all quadrants, with large hills immediately south of the runway.

See also
Transport in Haiti
List of airports in Haiti

References

External links
OpenStreetMap - Fond-des-Blancs

Airports in Haiti